Otávio Marques de Azevedo is a Brazilian businessman, the CEO of Andrade Gutierrez, a Brazilian conglomerate.

Azevedo received a bachelor's degree in Electrical Engineering from Pontifícia Universidade Católica de Minas Gerais.

In June 2015, he was arrested as part of a major investigation into corruption at the state-owned oil company Petrobras.

References

Living people
Brazilian businesspeople
Year of birth missing (living people)